SpectreVision (formerly The Woodshed) is an American film production company founded in 2010 by actor Elijah Wood and directors Daniel Noah and Josh C. Waller. SpectreVision is a genre driven company with a focus on psychological thriller and horror films.

At E3 2017, SpectreVision announced a collaboration with video game developer Ubisoft on their first video game project, a virtual reality project called Transference.

Filmography

Video games

References

External links

2010 establishments in California
Film production companies of the United States
Entertainment companies based in California
American companies established in 2010
Entertainment companies established in 2010
Companies based in Los Angeles